Laura Golarsa and Katarina Srebotnik were the defending champions, but none competed this year. Golarsa was injured and couldn't play in the entire season, while Srebotnik competed in the Fed Cup at the same week.

Sabine Appelmans and Kim Clijsters won the title by defeating Jennifer Hopkins and Petra Rampre 6–1, 6–1 in the final.

Seeds

Draw

Draw

References

External links
 Official results archive (ITF)
 Official results archive (WTA)

Belgian Open (tennis)
Mexx Benelux Open